Lupinica is a settlement in the Municipality of Šmartno pri Litiji in central Slovenia. It lies at the end of a small valley southeast of Šmartno just beyond Velika Kostrevnica. The area is part of the historical region of Lower Carniola. The municipality is included in the Central Slovenia Statistical Region.

References

External links
Lupinica at Geopedia

Populated places in the Municipality of Šmartno pri Litiji